NZRB may stand for
 New Zealand Rifle Brigade (Earl of Liverpool's Own) - a military unit that existed between 1 May 1915 and 4 February 1919.
 New Zealand Racing Board - the statutory body for all New Zealand sports betting.